The 2005 Atlantic Coast Conference men's basketball tournament took place from March 10–13 in Washington, D.C., at the MCI Center. This was the first time the tournament was played in Washington itself, as the previous ACC Tournaments in the D.C. area were played in suburban Landover, Maryland, at the Capital Centre. Duke won the tournament, defeating Georgia Tech in the championship game. Duke's JJ Redick won the tournament's Most Valuable Player award.

The 2005 ACC Tournament was the first, and only, ACC Tournament with 11 teams participating. Conference newcomers Miami and Virginia Tech participated in their first ACC tournament. Their debuts were unsuccessful, as both teams failed to win a game. The tournament expanded to 12 teams the following season, as Boston College joined from the Big East Conference.

Wake Forest's Chris Paul was suspended for his team's quarterfinal game against NC State for punching Julius Hodge in the groin in the season finale between the two teams. NC State took advantage of his absence, defeating Wake Forest en route to the semifinal round.

Bracket

AP Rankings at time of tournament

External links
 

Tournament
ACC men's basketball tournament
College basketball tournaments in Washington, D.C.
ACC men's basketball tournament
ACC men's basketball tournament